Apna Sangeet were a British Asian Bhangra band from Birmingham, England.

The group was formed in 1984 by six Birmingham musicians. In contrast to the more western sounds of contemporary groups like DCS, they played a very traditional style of bhangra with a dhol player centre stage. By 1991 they were platinum disc holders, and held the title of UK Asian Pop Award for Best Asian Band.

By 1994, the group had released nine albums and sold more than 2,000,000 records, and were awarded Best Bhangra Band by Movie International Magazine.

The Stage in 1995 described the group as a "superband...who are virtually unknown to non-Asians".

In 2009, the band reunited for one charity show. They also reformed for the 2014 Vaisakhi celebrations in Trafalgar Square, London, together with groups Heera and Premi.

Apna Sangeet released a song in 2021 on the album Hope with Kiss Music.

References

1983 establishments in England
Musical groups from Birmingham, West Midlands
Bhangra (music) musical groups